Kazazian, alternative spelling Kazazyan  is an Armenian surname. It may refer to:

Hagop Kazazian Pasha (1833–1891), high-ranking Ottoman official of Armenian origin who served as the Minister of Finance and the Minister of the Privy Treasury during the reign of Sultan Abdulhamid II
Haig H. Kazazian Jr. (1937-2022), American professor
Gaik Kazazian (born 1982) is an Armenian violinist
Georges Kazazian (born 1953), Egyptian-Armenian composer and oud player

See also
Kazaz, Iran
Kazazi, Iran